Bilhorod-Dnistrovskyi fortress (also known as Akkerman fortress) is a historical and architectural monument of the 13th-14th centuries. It is located in Bilhorod-Dnistrovskyi in the Odesa region of southwestern Ukraine, the historical Budjak.

History

Start of construction 

The fortress was built on the remains of Tyras, an ancient Greek city on the northern coast of the Black Sea which existed until the 4th century. Frequent attacks by invaders - first the Goths, then the Huns - destroyed the city. Antes, Slavs and Bulgarians lived on the site of Tyras after the Greeks. In the 10th century Bilhorod was part of Kievan Rus'’. Later it was owned by the Kingdom of Hungary, then the Principality of Galicia–Volhynia, where it stayed until the invasion of the Mongols.

It is not known when construction began on the fortress. Most historians today believe that it was a trading enclave of the Republic of Genoa on the Black Sea, first established in the 13th century. The territory was surrendered to the Golden Horde, but the Genoese managed to ally with the Mongols. Bilhorod was officially the Tatars’ city, but it was ruled by the Genoese. The fortress controlled the Dniester estuary.

In the second half of the 14th century the Genoese lost their influence in the Black Sea region, and safe passage across the Aegean Sea, because of increasing military pressure from the Ottomans. According to most historians, Lithuania came to replace Genoa. In the 14th century the Principality of Moldavia gained control over the Lithuanians.

Moldavian period 

After the territory came under the control of the Principality of Moldavia, the Moldavians started to call Bilhorod "Cetatea Alba" (literally White Citadel). In the 15th century the city was a metropolis with about 20,000 inhabitants - Moldavians, Greeks, Genoese, Armenians, Jews, Tatars. It was the start of the greatest development period in the city's history. The city was based on a fortress, which had already grown significantly. Its main elements had been constructed by 1440. The fortress had 34 towers, some as much as 20 meters tall. Outside, the fortress was surrounded by a deep moat. The fortress was built of white limestone, for which a mortar made of eggs, crushed marble, carbon, and silicon was used.

In 1440 one portion which was neither a wall nor a castle tower was completed. This segment is located outside the castle walls very close to the estuary and has remains preserved today. Inside the wall, 10 stone cores were inlaid in the wall as a kind of talisman. This part of the wall had no practical defensive value. For a long time historians and architects could not identify the purpose of it.

The cores inside the wall were shaped like a tetractys: a figure with ten points that form nine equilateral triangles. Possibly this was a magical symbol used in Druidic rituals. It is also one of the symbols of Masonic lodges. This confirms the view of many historians that the Bilhorod-Dnistrovskyi fortress was built by Freemasons and the incomprehensible portion was made specifically for the tetractys. Also, a plate was found in one of the towers, inscribed with: "Master Fedorko finished construction in 1440". Master was a name for the head of the Masonic lodge.

Another explanation of Bilhorod's tetractys is much more pragmatic: some claim it is just a variant of a sundial calendar.

In the second half of the 15th century, the Moldavian principality was marred by a civil war between different factions, and king Bogdan II was murdered in an ambush by his brother Peter III Aaron in 1451. In 1457, the throne of Moldavia was captured by Stephen III of Moldavia (son of Bogdan II) with the help of his cousin Vlad the Impaler, prince of Wallachia. Since Cetatea Alba was the main defensive center in the southeast of the state, located right on the trade route between Europe and Asia, it was given renewed attention under a new ruler. The fortress was constructed and reinforced with new stronger walls and a large gate, which then served as the main entrance to the fortress. In order to guard it, a permanent garrison was placed.

Ottoman period 
In the 15th century, The Ottoman Empire repeatedly tried to capture the city. The hardest siege was in August 1484, when a 300,000-man army of Ottoman sultan Bayezid II and 50,000 troops of the Crimean Khan Meñli I Giray, supported by over 100 large ships, besieged the castle from the coast and estuary. After a nine-day siege, the fortress was taken. In 1485, Stephen the Great tried to recapture Bilhorod, but failed. Turks would rule there for 328 years.

The Ottoman Empire made Bilhorod one of its strongholds in the north. The city suffered from endless attacks by the Zaporozhian Cossacks. Cossack chieftains repeatedly tried to sack the city - Hryhoriy Loboda, Severyn Nalivaiko, Ivan Sulima, Ivan Sirko, and Semen Paliy. Moldavians and Poles did not leave the city in peace either. However, Bilhorod remained an impregnable stronghold. Much attention to the fortress was also paid by the vassals of Turkey: Crimean Tatars. Bilhorod was often a place of refuge during the campaigns, and the Crimean Khan İslâm II Giray even died in the fortress and was buried in the mosque, of which only one minaret now remains.

During the long Turkish domination, the Bilhorod fortress was repeatedly rebuilt and renovated with new fortifications. In 1657 Melek Ahmed Pasha significantly strengthened the fortress. In 1707, the Turks invited French military engineers, who constructed a new bastion line. After 1756, consolidation and repairs were made to the fortress almost every year.

The 18th century saw three Russian-Turkish wars. First, in 1770, the fortress was invaded by the Russian army. The Russian invaders could not stay there long, and, according to Treaty of Küçük Kaynarca, finally returned to the city in 1774. In 1789, the town was captured without a fight by a large detachment of Don Cossacks and a Jäger (infantry) hunter corps headed by Mikhail Kutuzov. The following year, Kutuzov became commander of the fortress, but had to leave this position soon after. According to the agreement between Russia and the Ottoman Empire, the river Dniester was their border. The Ottoman period of Bilhorod ended in 1812, following the Russo-Turkish war of 1806-1812, when Russia took the eastern part of the Principality of Moldavia, between the Prut and Dniester rivers. The Treaty of Bucharest (1812) put Bessarabia (including Budjak) and Bilhorod under the control of the Russian Empire.

20th century 
In 1918, Romania briefly reestablished control over Budjak, after the unification of Romania and Bessarabia in 1918, but the Soviets reclaimed the city and the surrounding territory in 1940 and again in 1944.

References

 Білгород-Дністровський. Фортеця. Роман Маленков. Україна Інкогніта
 Мандри Україною. Білгород-Дністровський 
 Одеса та Білгород-Дністровська фортеця, 2001–2002, 2004 та 2007 роки
 3D віртуальна подорож по фортеці

Bilhorod-Dnistrovskyi
Castles in Ukraine
Fortifications in Ukraine